The 2000 Nebelhorn Trophy took place between September 5 and 8, 2000 at the Bundesleistungszentrum Oberstdorf. It is an international senior-level figure skating competition organized by the Deutsche Eislauf-Union and held annually in Oberstdorf, Germany. The competition is named after the Nebelhorn, a nearby mountain.

Skaters were entered by their respective national federations, rather than receiving individual invitations as in the Grand Prix of Figure Skating, and competed in four disciplines: men's singles, ladies' singles, pair skating, and ice dance. The Fritz-Geiger-Memorial Trophy was presented to the country with the highest placements across all disciplines.

Results

Men

Ladies

Pairs

Ice dance

External links
 2000 Nebelhorn Trophy

Nebelhorn Trophy
Nebelhorn Trophy, 2000
2000 in German sport